Per vivere meglio, divertitevi con noi (Italian for "To live better, have fun with us") is a 1978 Italian anthology comedy film written and directed by Flavio Mogherini.

Cast 
 Segment "Un incontro molto ravvicinato"
Monica Vitti: Valentina Contarini
Cesare Barro: Azzurro  
Eugene Walter: Nane

 Segment "Il teorema gregoriano"
Johnny Dorelli: Ottavio Del Bon
Catherine Spaak: Clodia

 Segment "Non si può spiegare, bisogna vederlo"
Renato Pozzetto: Siro Sante
Milena Vukotic: Picci
Elio Crovetto: Picci's husband
Francesco Salvi: Groom
Tiziana Pini: Lilli

References

External links

1978 films
Italian comedy films
Films directed by Flavio Mogherini
Commedia all'italiana
1970s science fiction comedy films
Films about gambling
Films about con artists
1978 comedy films
1970s Italian films
1970s Italian-language films